Moldova President's Cup is an international road bicycle racing tournament in Chişinău (Moldova), it was created in 2003.

References

External links
Moldova President's Cup results at The Cycling Website
https://web.archive.org/web/20110727091904/http://sport.moldova.org/news/over-200-cyclists-from-7-countries-competed-for-presidents-cup-12903-eng.html
https://web.archive.org/web/20160204181317/http://www.moldova.md/en/societate/2893/

June events
Cycle races in Moldova
Recurring sporting events established in 2004
2004 establishments in Moldova
Men's road bicycle races
Summer events in Moldova